Alina Nanu (born ) is a professional ballet dancer, a principal dancer with the National Theatre (Prague). Becoming the youngest principal dancer in the history of the National Theatre of the Czech Republic.

Biography 

Alina Nanu was born in Chisinau, Moldova in a family with Moldovan and Russian roots by father and having Ossetian roots on her maternal side. At the age of 9 years she started to attend Choreographic School of Chisinau. At the age of 19 years Alina moved to Prague, Czech Republic to continue studies in Prague Conservatory. Alina started her carrier at State Opera Prague and joined the ballet of National Theatre in 2012.

Career

Nominations and Awards

References

External links 
 
 
 

Moldovan artists
Prague Conservatory alumni
Ballerinas
1990 births
Living people
People from Chișinău
Recipients of the Thalia Award